Shwe Kokko Myaing, commonly known as Shwe Kokko, is a village in Myawaddy Township, Myawaddy District in the Kayin State of south-east Myanmar. Shwe Kokko lies on the left (western) bank of the Moei River (Thaungyin River), facing Thailand to the east. In recent years, Shwe Kokko has evolved into an organized crime and human trafficking hub, due to the Burmese government's limited reach and oversight in this remote area. Chinese-led development projects in Shwe Kokko, including Yatai New City, have been involved in illegal gambling, human trafficking, extortion, and cyber scam operations. As Cambodia intensified its crackdown on illegal online gambling in 2019, Chinese crime syndicates and casino operators have found a new base in Myanmar's peripheral border areas.

As of May 2022, 1,225 Chinese nationals were legally residing in Shwe Kokko, and thousands of illegal Chinese workers migrate to the village for work. Shwe Kokko is the destination of many Asian human trafficking victims (from countries such as Thailand, Cambodia, Laos, Malaysia, Hong Kong, and India) who have been forced to work in Shwe Kokko in online scam operations run by Chinese crime syndicates, lured by the prospect of romance and well-paying jobs. In September 2022, over 300 Indian nationals were reported to be held hostage in Shwe Kokko.

Administration 
Shwe Kokko is home to the headquarters of the Kayin State Border Guard Force (BGF), which consists of former Democratic Karen Buddhist Army forces that were formally integrated into the Myanmar Armed Forces in August 2010. The Kayin State BGF is led by Colonel Saw Chit Thu, and has about 6,000 troops that are organised into 13 batallions.

Development projects 
In 2018 and 2019, the Cambodian government banned online casino gambling, forcing Chinese investors and crime syndicates to exit Sihanoukville, which had previously seen a major casino boom. In 2019, multiple casinos shifted their operations to Shwe Kokko.

Shwe Kokko is home to Yatai New City as a partnership between Chit Lin Myaing Company and Yatai International Holdings Group (Yatai IHG), which is a regional online gambling operation owned by Chinese fugitive, She Zhijiang. Chit Lin Myaing is owned by the Kayin State Border Guard Force, and will receive 30% of profits from this development, with the remainder of profits going to Yatai. In 2019, Singaporean-owned Building Cities Beyond Blockchain became Yatai's exclusive blockchain partner. The use of blockchain technology enables entities to circumvent government authorities, obscure financial transactions, and launder money. Building Cities Beyond Blockchain and Yatai launched Fincy, a financial platform in Shwe Kokko, without the approval of Myanmar’s Central Bank or any government ministry.

Yatai portrayed the development as a US$15 billion special economic zone (SEZ), aimed at becoming a playground for Chinese gamblers near the Burmese-Thai border. In reality, Shwe Kokko is not an approved SEZ, which are established in accordance with Myanmar's SEZ laws. In October 2020, China's government officially distanced itself from the project; China's ambassador to Myanmar, Chen Hai, clarified this project was not part of the Belt and Road Initiative.

Controversy 
The Yatai project has been the subject of significant controversy, owing to concerns over the absence of official approval, illegal land confiscations, plans to build a casino, criminal activities, money laundering, and local sentiment. Yatai began large-scale construction in 2017, even though the Myanmar Investment Commission had only approved a small-scale project covering . MIC had only granted permission for the construction of 59 luxury villas on 22.5 acres of land, but the actual construction has far outpaced the permitted development. The project has also utilized thousands of Chinese workers, despite claims that it would generate job opportunities for locals. In June 2020, the Burmese government established a national tribunal to investigate irregularities surrounding this development project, successfully halting the project. Tensions between the Kayin State Border Guard Force and the Myanmar Armed Forces escalated over the development. 

However, after the 2021 Myanmar coup d'état, during which the Burmese military deposed the civilian-led government, the military became pre-occupied with addressing the ensuing Myanmar civil war, enabling the Yatai development to resume.

Remarks

Populated places in Kayin State